Lanka Sathosa also known as Sathosa is a wholesale and retail chain located in Sri Lanka. It is considered to be the largest state-owned retail chain in the country and was established in 2005. Sathosa was incorporated as a state-owned enterprise under Companies Act no 7 of 2007 and it is regulated by the Ministry of Industry and Commerce. The main function of Sathosa is to set prices of many essential items in the domestic retail market.

Nushad Perera was appointed as the chairman of Lanka Sathosa in January 2020. As of 2019, the retail chain expanded its branch of network beyond 400. Sathosa has also guaranteed to sell essential items at concessionary prices during tough times including the coronavirus pandemic in the country. However it has also been widely criticised in recent years for continuous loss making and defaulting on payments to suppliers.

Controversies 
Johnston Fernando was arrested on 5 May 2015 in relation to the non-payment for goods worth more than 5 million rupees but was released on bail amounting to Rs. 25,000 and three sureties worth Rs. 2.5 million each. He is also being investigated on financial irregularities connected to Sathosa during his tenure as the Cooperatives and Internal Trade Minister.

On 5 June 2019, the All Island Canteen Owners' Association Chairman (AICOA) complained that Rishad Bathiudeen abused the Consumer Affairs Authority (CAA) to mistreat Sinhalese businessmen and also distributed food commodities unfit for human consumption through Lanka Sathosa.

References 

Government-owned companies of Sri Lanka
Retail markets in Sri Lanka
Supermarkets of Sri Lanka
Sri Lankan companies established in 2005
Retail companies established in 2005